Sweden competed at the 2011 World Championships in Athletics from August 27 to September 4 in Daegu, South Korea.

Team selection

A team of 16 athletes was
announced to represent the country
in the event.  The most prominent members of the squad are Olympic gold
medalists triple jumper
Christian Olsson and heptathlete Carolina Klüft, who starts in this year's long
jump competition.  The team includes one athlete invited by the IPC for exhibition events: Gunilla Wallengren, 800m T54 (wheelchair) women.

Results

Men

Women

Heptathlon

References

External links
Official local organising committee website
Official IAAF competition website

Nations at the 2011 World Championships in Athletics
World Championships in Athletics
Sweden at the World Championships in Athletics